The 2019–20 UMass Minutemen basketball team represents the University of Massachusetts Amherst during the 2019–20 NCAA Division I men's basketball season. The Minutemen are led by third-year head coach Matt McCall and play their home games at the William D. Mullins Memorial Center in Amherst, Massachusetts as members of the Atlantic 10 Conference. They finished the season 14–17, 8–10 in A-10 play to finish in eighth place. Their season ended with the A-10 tournament and all other postseason tournaments were canceled due to the ongoing coronavirus pandemic.

Previous season
The Minutemen finished the 2018–19 season 11–21, 4–14 in A-10 play to finish in 13th place. They lost to George Washington in the first round of the A-10 tournament.

Departures

Incoming transfers

2019 recruiting class

Roster

Schedule and results

|-
!colspan=9 style=| Exhibition

|-
!colspan=9 style=| Non-conference regular season

|-
!colspan=9 style=| A-10 regular season

|-
!colspan=9 style=| A-10 tournament

Source

References

UMass Minutemen basketball seasons
Umass
UMass Minutemen basketball
UMass Minutemen basketball